Kyla Tamiko LeBlanc (née Uyede), better known by her stage name Kytami, is a Canadian musician. Born in Vancouver, she started taking violin lessons at the age of three, and trained classically at the Vancouver Academy of Music from ages 3 to 17. At the age of 23 she started playing in a band at the Dubh Linn Gate Pub. In 2002 she moved back to Vancouver and recorded her first album Conflation. In 2006 she co-founded the group Delhi 2 Dublin, but left in late 2010 to continue pursuing her solo career. The "Kytami" stage name blends her first and middle names.  She is of mixed Japanese, Filipino, and English descent.

Discography

SOLO
2002 Conflation
2012 "Kytami"

WITH DELHI 2 DUBLIN
Delhi 2 Dublin (Released 13 December 2007)
Delhi 2 Dublin Remixed (Released 2008)
Planet Electric (Released 4 May 2010)
Planet: Electrified (Released 26 April 2011)
Delhi to Dubland EP (Released 13 September 2011)

WITH BLACKIE AND THE TRIUMPHS
"Thinkinaboutdrinkin" (Released 2011)

References

External links
 Official website

1975 births
Living people
Canadian classical violinists
Canadian people of English descent
Canadian musicians of Filipino descent
Canadian musicians of Japanese descent
21st-century Canadian rappers
Canadian rock violinists
Canadian women rappers
Musicians from Vancouver
21st-century classical violinists
Canadian women violinists and fiddlers
21st-century Canadian violinists and fiddlers
21st-century women rappers